The Venice Giardini or Giardini della Biennale is an area of parkland in the historic city of Venice which hosts the Venice Biennale Art Festival, a major part of the city's cultural Biennale. The gardens were created by Napoleon Bonaparte who drained an area of marshland in order to create a public garden on the banks of the Bacino di San Marco which is a narrow stretch of water dividing the gardens from St. Mark's Square and the Doge's Palace.

The gardens contain 30 permanent pavilions. Each pavilion is allocated to a particular nation and displays works of art by its nationals during the Venice Biennale. Several of the pavilions were designed by leading architects of the 20th century, including Carlo Scarpa and Alvar Aalto.

The gardens are also famous for the many cats which run wild in the vicinity and for some of the sculptures such as the statue of Garibaldi situated at the entrance.

History

The Giardini is arguably the pre-eminent  traditional site of La Biennale Art Exhibitions since the first edition in 1895. It rose to the eastern edge of Venice and was made by Napoleon at the beginning of the 19th century. After it was launched, the success of the first editions which attracted approximately 200,000 visitors in 1895 and about 300,000 in 1899, continued to grow. Starting from the launch in 1907 several foreign pavilions were added to the already built Central Pavilion. The Giardini now hosts 30 pavilions of foreign countries, some of them designed by architects such as Josef Hoffmann's Austria Pavilion, Gerrit Thomas Rietveld's Dutch pavilion or the Finnish pavilion, a pre-fabricated with a trapezoidal plan designed by Alvar Aalto.

References

External links

La Biennale di Venezia Art Venues : Giardini
A brief history of I Giardini: Or a brief history of the Venice Biennale seen from the Giardini. (Vittoria Martini)

Geography of Venice
Gardens in Veneto
Parks in Veneto
Venice Biennale
Tourist attractions in Venice